The 1995–96 MetJHL season is the 5th season of the Metro Junior A Hockey League (MetJHL). The 12 teams of the Eastern and Western Divisions competed in a 52-game schedule.  The top 4 teams in each division made the playoffs.

The winner of the MetJHL playoffs, the Caledon Canadians, could not move into national playdowns as the Metro was not a member of the Ontario Hockey Association.

Changes
MetJHL leaves Ontario Hockey Association.
Changes division names from Fullan and Bauer to Eastern and Western.
Shelburne Hornets join MetJHL.
Markham Waxers join MetJHL from OPJHL.
Niagara Scenic join MetJHL from EJHL.
St. Michael's Buzzers, Bramalea Blues, Kingston Voyageurs and Mississauga Senators leave MetJHL for OPJHL.
Aurora Eagles become Aurora Tigers.
Richmond Hill Riot leave MetJHL.

Final standings
Note: GP = Games played; W = Wins; L = Losses; OTL = Overtime losses; SL = Shootout losses; GF = Goals for; GA = Goals against; PTS = Points; x = clinched playoff berth; y = clinched division title; z = clinched conference title

1995-96 MetJHL Playoffs
Quarter-final
Wexford Raiders defeated Wellington Dukes 4-games-to-1
Thornhill Islanders defeated Markham Waxers 4-games-to-1
Caledon Canadians defeated Muskoka Bears 4-games-to-2
Niagara Scenic defeated Aurora Tigers 4-games-to-3
Semi-final
Thornhill Islanders defeated Wexford Raiders 4-games-to-2
Caledon Canadians defeated Niagara Scenic 4-games-to-none
Final
Caledon Canadians defeated Thornhill Islanders 4-games-to-3

Players selected in 1996 NHL Entry Draft
Rd 1 #15   Dainius Zubrus -	Philadelphia Flyers	(Caledon Canadians)

See also
 1996 Royal Bank Cup
 Dudley Hewitt Cup
 List of Ontario Hockey Association Junior A seasons
 Ontario Junior A Hockey League
 Northern Ontario Junior Hockey League
 1995 in ice hockey
 1996 in ice hockey

References

External links
 Official website of the Ontario Junior Hockey League
 Official website of the Canadian Junior Hockey League

Metro Junior A Hockey League seasons
MetJHL